Cobeja is a municipality located in the province of Toledo, Castile-La Mancha, Spain. According to the 2006 census (INE), the municipality has a population of 2047 inhabitants.

History 

Alfonso VI gave the population of Cubeixa in 1086, along with other territories to the church Santa Maria de Toledo, following the recapture of the city. Was repopulated in 1155 with 18 inhabitants, and in 1159, the council of Toledo donates three quarters of the village of Alameda at the end of Cobeja.

In the list of rents received in 1232 the Cathedral of Toledo is mentioned Couexa. The reviews that appear in the Mozarabic documents of the time there is the difficulty of distinguishing Cobeja of Cobisa because Arabic is written in the same way.

Location 

The town is situated on a plain of the county of La Sagra and adjoining populations Pantoja, Alameda de la Sagra, Villaseca de la Sagra and Villaluenga de la Sagra, all of Toledo.

Administration 

List of mayors since the democratic elections of 1979

Demography 

The following table shows the evolution of population between 1996 and 2006 according to data from the Instituto Nacional de Estadística (INE).

Monuments 
To highlight the Church of San Juan Bautista and the water source, dating from 1702

Festivities 
 20 January: Saint Sebastian
 Third weekend of September: Festivities in honor of the Virgen del Carmen

References

Municipalities in the Province of Toledo